Indegene Limited is a company offering research and development and management services to healthcare and pharmaceutical enterprises. It was founded in 1998 and is based in Bangalore, India.

History
Indegene was founded in 1998 by Dr. Rajesh Nair, Manish Gupta, Gaurav Kapoor, Dr.Sanjay Parikh and Anand Kiran. Indegene's first acquisition was Medsn, a company that provided medical education. Medsn continued to operate under the same name in the United States. In 2008, Medsn officially became known as Indegene Pharmaceutical Solutions in the United States. In 2006, Indegene acquired MedCases, a continuing medical education company based in the United States.

In 2009, Indegene signed a master service agreement with six pharmaceutical companies. The following year, Indegene acquired Canada-based Aptilon, a multichannel marketing firm, for $4 million. The company subsequently acquired Atlanta-based Total Therapeutic Management in 2014.

In February 2021, Carlyle and Brighton Park invested $200 million in Indegene.

Operations
Indegene has offices in India, the United States, the European Union, and Asia-Pacific.

In 2011 and 2012, The Economic Times named Indegene one of the best companies to work for in the Professional Services industry.

See also
 IQVIA

References

Companies based in Bangalore
Indian companies established in 1998
1998 establishments in Karnataka
Health care companies established in 1998